Charis Eng, M.D., Ph.D., is a Singapore-born physician-scientist and geneticist at the Cleveland Clinic, notable for identifying the PTEN gene. She is the Chairwoman and founding Director of the Genomic Medicine Institute of the Cleveland Clinic, founding Director and attending clinical cancer geneticist of the institute’s clinical component, the Center for Personalized Genetic Healthcare, and Professor and Vice Chairwoman of the Department of Genetics and Genome Sciences at Case Western Reserve University School of Medicine.

Education
Professor Eng was born in Singapore in the year 1962 and grew up in Bristol, England. She graduated from the University of Chicago Laboratory Schools and matriculated in the University of Chicago at age 16. She earned her Ph.D. in Developmental Biology in 1986 and her M.D. in 1988, both from the Pritzker School of Medicine, University of Chicago. Afterwards, she specialized in internal medicine at Beth Israel Hospital, Boston and trained in medical oncology at Harvard’s Dana-Farber Cancer Institute. She was formally trained in clinical cancer genetics at the University of Cambridge and the Royal Marsden NHS Trust, UK, and in laboratory-based human cancer genetics by Prof Sir Bruce Ponder. Following her training, Dr Eng became one of only four formally-trained clinical cancer geneticists in the US.

Career
Eng returned to the Farber as Assistant Professor of Medicine at the end of 1995, and in January 1999 joined The Ohio State University as Associate Professor of Medicine and Director of the Clinical Cancer Genetics Program. In 2001, she was appointed to the Davis Professorship and Co-Director of the Division of Human Genetics in the Department of Internal Medicine. In 2002, she was promoted to Professor and Division Director, holding the Klotz Endowed Chair.

Eng joined the Cleveland Clinic in 2005, and became the founding director of the Cleveland Clinic's Genomic Medicine Institute and the Center for Personalized Genetic Healthcare, and Professor and Vice Chair of the Department of Genetics and Genome Sciences at Case Western Reserve University School of Medicine.

Outside of the lab, Eng acted as the primary genetics consultant to the Discovery Health Channel documentary "Curse of the Elephant Man", which traced the genetic causes of Joseph Merrick's disfiguring disorder.

She is an active mentor to trainees at all levels and junior faculty locally, nationally and internationally, serving as sponsor and advocate for women and minorities in medicine and science.

Research
Dr Eng’s research has been acknowledged as the paradigm for performing cancer genetics research which can be brought to clinical practice. At the clinical interface, she is acknowledged as one of the rare “go to” people on what is and how to implement genetic- and genomics-enabled personalized healthcare. She was the first to discover a link between mutations in the cancer suppressor gene PTEN and Cowden and other syndromes, which predispose patients to several types of cancer.

Her scientific accomplishments have set the practice model for how to apply laboratory-based genetics and genomics in the pre-symptomatic diagnosis, counseling and management of patients and their as-yet unaffected family members. Dr Eng’s two major ground-breaking investigative models on RET and related genes in multiple endocrine neoplasia type 2 (MEN 2; characterized by medullary thyroid cancer, pheochromocytoma and hyperparathyroidism), and PTEN in Cowden syndrome (high risk of breast and thyroid cancers) have been acknowledged as the paradigm for the practice of clinical cancer genetics.

Her pioneering contributions span over 25+ years and broadly encompass:

1.   Discovery of germline genetic causes of heritable cancer syndromes

2.   Characterization of molecular mechanisms of the newly discovered genes – importantly, thinking outside the box to identify non-canonical roles in disease pathogenesis. Her mechanistic discoveries have been generalizable to idiopathic autism and somatic alterations in a large proportion of sporadic neoplasias – leading to the unanticipated concept that predisposition genes for inherited cancers are indeed the most common somatic genes altered in sporadic cancers

3.   Most important to the breakthrough prize, her discoveries form the basis for clinical management guidelines globally

Representative Awards & Honors 

 Elected to the American Society for Clinical Investigation (ASCI), 2001
 Doris Duke Distinguished Clinical Scientist Award, 2002
 Elected to the American Association for the Advancement of Science (AAAS), 2003
 Elected to the Association of American Physicians (AAP), 2004
 Local Legend from Ohio, bestowed by the American Medical Women’s Association in conjunction with the US Senate on women physicians who have demonstrated commitment, originality, innovation and/or creativity in their fields of medicine, 2005
 American Cancer Society Clinical Research Professor, 2009
 Served on US Department of Health and Human Services Secretary’s Advisory Committee on Genetics, Health and Society, 2009-2011
 Elected to the National Academy of Medicine, 2010
 Named as one of 400 most influential biomedical researchers in the world, 2013
 American Medical Association Women Physicians’ Section Mentorship Recognition, 2013
 American Medical Women’s Association Exceptional Mentor Award, 2014
 University of Chicago Medical Alumni Distinguished Service Award, 2015
 University of Chicago Alumni Association Professional Achievement Award, 2017
 American Cancer Society (National) Medal of Honor (Clinical Research), 2018
 Top 0.01% Impactful Scientists (all fields) in the World, 2019
 AAAS Fellow Special Digital Ribbon for extraordinary achievements advancing science, 2020
 University of Chicago Laboratory Schools Distinguished Alumna Award, 2021

References

American geneticists
American physicians
Living people
1962 births
20th-century American women scientists
21st-century American women scientists
Cleveland Clinic people
Members of the National Academy of Medicine